Len Smith (4 May 1913 – 11 October 1972) was an  Australian rules footballer who played with North Melbourne in the Victorian Football League (VFL).

Notes

External links 

1913 births
1972 deaths
Australian rules footballers from Victoria (Australia)
North Melbourne Football Club players